is a railway station on the Kagoshima Main Line, operated by JR Kyushu in Tamana City, Kumamoto Prefecture, Japan.

Lines 

Layout 
The station consists of two side platforms serving two tracks at grade. The station building is a wooden structure of traditional Japanese design. The station is not staffed by JR Kyushu but some types of tickets are available from a kan'i itaku agent on site who operates the ticket window. Access to the opposite side platform is by means of a footbridge.

Adjacent stations

History
Japanese Government Railways (JGR) opened the station on 3 April 1935 as an additional station on the existing track of the Kagoshima Main Line. With the privatization of Japanese National Railways (JNR), the successor of JGR, on 1 April 1987, JR Kyushu took over control of the station.

References

External links
Higo-Ikura Station (JR Kyushu)

Railway stations in Kumamoto Prefecture
Railway stations in Japan opened in 1935